Ayala Avenue is a major thoroughfare in Makati, the Philippines. It is one of the busiest roads in Metro Manila, crossing through the heart of the Makati Central Business District. Because of the many businesses located along the avenue, Ayala Avenue is nicknamed the "Wall Street of the Philippines" and dubbed in the 1970s and 1980s as the "Madison Avenue of the Philippines".

History

Ayala Avenue's segment from the present-day Gil Puyat (Buendia) Avenue to Makati Avenue used to be the primary runway of the Nielson Airport, which was inaugurated in 1937 and was one of the first airports built in Luzon, while its extension occupies a segment of an old road that connected the Santa Ana Park and McKinley–Pasay Road. The airport was destroyed during the Japanese occupation of the Philippines on December 10, 1941, and resumed operations after the end World War II in 1947. The airport closed in 1948 and its permanent facilities were passed on the owner of the land, Ayala y Compañía. The runways were then converted into roads as part of Ayala's plan to build a new business district in the area. The modern avenue was completed in the mid-1950s, eventually connecting it to Highway 54 (now EDSA).

It later created a new segment between Kamagong Street in San Antonio Village and Metropolitan Avenue, connecting it to South Avenue. In 1998, a flyover was built for left turners onto EDSA northbound.

Bicycle lanes

In 2020, in response to the growing popularity of bicycle commuting and ownership amidst the COVID-19 pandemic, the Makati Central Estate Association (MaCEA) and Ayala Land through its Make it Makati campaign designated  bicycle lanes along Ayala Avenue from Gil Puyat Avenue to EDSA, protected by bollards and exclusive to non-motorized bicycles and scooters. Bicycle boxes were also added to intersections to allow left-turns. The lanes underwent a trial run on August 7, 2020, and were completed on September 7, 2020. Following this, designated stops for public transport services were also moved to the middle lane of the road.

Shared lanes scheme controversy
On February 10, 2023, the Make It Makati announced that the bicycle lanes along Ayala Avenue would be changed to shared lane markings (also called sharrows) starting February 15, 2023, and that both motor vehicles and public transport vehicles would be allowed to use the lane. This announcement was met with opposition from cyclists, commuters, and several organizations, who argued that the removal of physical protection on bicycle lanes along major roads leads to intrusion by motor vehicles. The initial announcement was received negatively, in which Make It Makati responded to the negative feedback by justifying the changes as a response to increased public transport demand and "to better serve the needs of everyone in the community". Despite the backlash, they announced they would push through with the changes.

In response, bicycle commuters, car owners, commuters, students, Makati employees, and supporting individuals, as well as several mobility organizations formed the #MakeItSaferMakati movement and signed a joint statement in opposition to the sharrows scheme. The movement expressed concern that the proposed removal of physically protected bicycle lanes on Ayala Avenue is part of a larger trend of removing such lanes all across the country, warning that the lack of physical protection on bicycle lanes along major roads leads to motor vehicles constantly intruding into them. Because of this, they argue that removing physical protection for bicycle lanes on Ayala Avenue would put cyclists in danger and could be fatal. 

On February 12, 2023, the movement participated in a protest ride along Ayala Avenue, demanding the recantation of the sharrows scheme and their opposition to the removal of physical protection from bicycle lanes. In response, Make It Makati issued an announcement on February 14 stating that it would defer the implementation of the sharrows scheme to March 6, 2023, to collect feedback and engage in dialogue with the biking community. The #MakeItSaferMakati movement has stated that representatives of Ayala Land have reached out to them, assuring that the scheme will be deferred until "they have collected feedback and engaged in a dialogue with the biking community to exchange ideas and best practices."

Landmarks

Ayala Center

The Ayala Center, which comprises eight distinct shopping centers, is partially located on Ayala Avenue, specifically the Glorietta complex, including Rustan's, 6750 Ayala Avenue, Makati Shangri-La Hotel and the One Ayala complex.

Ayala Triangle
 

The Ayala Triangle is a sub-district of the Makati Central Business District, comprising the parcel of land between Ayala Avenue, Makati Avenue and Paseo de Roxas, as well as the buildings on those streets. Many multinational companies, banks and other major businesses are located within the triangle. A few upscale boutiques, restaurants and a park called Ayala Triangle Gardens are also located in the area.

PBCom Tower

PBCom Tower, one of the tallest buildings in the Philippines, is located at Ayala Avenue and V.A. Rufino Street. It serves as the headquarters of the Philippine Bank of Communications. It was the tallest building in the Philippines from 2000 to 2017.

Apartment Ridge
Apartment Ridge is a complex of apartment and condominium buildings along the streets of Makati and Ayala Avenues outside Urdaneta Village. In this area, The Peninsula Manila, Makati Tuscany, Discovery Primea, The Estate Makati, Ritz Towers, Pacific Plaza Condominium, Twin Towers, and Urdaneta Apartments are located along the avenue.

Government-owned buildings
 Makati City Police Station
 Makati City Fire Station

Other famous buildings
Ayala Avenue is home to many other landmark buildings, which house many large Philippine businesses including:
 Alphaland Makati Place
 Alveo Financial Tower
 Ayala North Exchange
 Ayala Avenue Office Tower (headquarters of Monde Nissin Corporation)
 Ayala Tower One (headquarters of the Ayala Corporation and home to the Philippine Stock Exchange's Makati trading floor)
 Bank of the Philippine Islands headquarters
 Convergys Philippines Services Center
 The Enterprise Center neoclassical twin towers
 G.T. International Tower
 Insular Life Building (old headquarters of Insular Life)
 LKG Tower
 L. V. Locsin Building
 Makati Sky Plaza
 NEX Tower
 The Peninsula Manila
 PeopleSupport Center
 PLDT Tower (headquarters of PLDT, Inc.)
 PNB Makati Center (Allied Bank Center; former headquarters of Allied Bank)
 RCBC Plaza (headquarters of the Rizal Commercial Banking Corporation)
 Rufino Plaza (headquarters of the Rufino Family)
 Security Bank Center (headquarters of the Security Bank Corporation)
 Smart Tower (headquarters of the Smart Communications)
 SSS Makati Building (former headquarters of Union Bank of the Philippines, Inc.)
 STI Holdings Center
 Sycip, Gorres, Velayo & Co. (SGV) Building (a member firm of Ernst & Young Global)

Other structures
 The monuments of Benigno Aquino Jr. and Gabriela Silang
 Pedestrian underpasses at Parkway Drive (Glorietta), Legazpi, Paseo de Roxas, V.A. Rufino and Salcedo/H.V. Dela Costa intersections
 Buendia Freedom Park

Intersections

References

Streets in Metro Manila
Makati Central Business District
Shopping districts and streets in Metro Manila
Zobel de Ayala family